Frederick Taaffe (7 January 1899 – 2 April 1964) was an Australian cricketer. He played eighteen first-class matches for Western Australia between 1922 and 1937.

See also
 List of Western Australia first-class cricketers

References

External links
 

1899 births
1964 deaths
Australian cricketers
Western Australia cricketers